Nannacara taenia is a species of cichlid found near Belém in Brazil in South America.  This species grows to a length of  SL.

References

taenia
Fish described in 1912
Taxa named by Charles Tate Regan
Fish of Brazil